Renaissance is a public artwork by American artist David Bakalar, located at the American Association for the Advancement of Science in Washington, D.C., United States.

Description

Renaissance consists of two granite pieces placed upon a stone display. The proper left piece is shaped like an obelisk cut in half placed on the diagonal on the display. Its tip is a gold triangle. The proper right piece features a granite sphere resting on a triangular shaped pedestal. The tip of the obelisk is close to the sphere, a few inches from touching the ball. It aims towards a gold disk placed on the sphere. The sculpture sits outside the entrance to the William T. Golden Center for Science and Engineering.

Artist

David Bakalar was a physicist before becoming a sculptor. With degrees from Harvard University and Massachusetts Institute of Technology, science influences his creation process. Founder of Transitron Electronic Corporation, his work specialized in transistor design and manufacturing, his tenure lasted thirty years before devoting himself to sculpture.

His work is in the collections of MIT, Massachusetts College of Art, Brandeis University, Columbia University Law School and others.

Bakalar describes his work: "I've always been fascinated by the codes and molecules that are the Life Force. My sculptures, subject to multiple interpretations, abstractly reflect the complexity of this force and our common identity with all of nature."

Acquisition

The piece was donated in September 1999 by the artist for permanent display at AAAS. Its dedication coincided with an exhibit of Bakalar's work that ran through February 2000 at AAAS.

See also
 List of public art in Washington, D.C., Ward 2

References

Further reading
Narayanan, Nisha, Lisa Onaga & Coimbra Sirica. AAAS News and Notes Science. New Series, Vol. 292, No 5521. 2001. p. 1563.

1989 establishments in Washington, D.C.
1989 sculptures
American Association for the Advancement of Science
Gold sculptures in the United States
Granite sculptures in Washington, D.C.
Outdoor sculptures in Washington, D.C.
Northwest (Washington, D.C.)